Eriophyllum lanosum, the white woolly daisy or white easterbonnets, is a spring wildflower in the family Asteraceae. It grows in the eastern Mojave Desert and the Sonoran Desert in the southwestern United States (California, Arizona, Nevada, Utah, New Mexico) and northwestern Mexico (Baja California + Sonora).

The plant is often unnoticed because it blends in with gravel and sand. It has a white-woolly stem and moderately woolly leaves. The plant produces one flower head per flowering stalk. Each head has 8–10 ray florets, white with red veins. These surround 10–20 tiny yellow disc florets.

References

External links

United States Department of Agriculture Plants Profile.  Antheropeas lanosum (Gray) Rydb.

lanosum
North American desert flora
Flora of Northwestern Mexico
Flora of the Southwestern United States
Flora of the California desert regions
Flora of the Sonoran Deserts
Natural history of the Mojave Desert
Plants described in 1857
Taxa named by Asa Gray
Flora without expected TNC conservation status